Marik Vos-Lundh (3 June 1923 – 13 July 1994) was a Swedish costume designer and production designer who won the Academy Award for Best Costume Design in 1984 for Fanny and Alexander.

She was a member of the women's association Nya Idun and served as its president from 1977 to 1980.

Filmography
The Virgin Spring (1960) Nominated for Academy Award for Best Costume Design
Nils Holgerssons underbara resa (1962)
The Silence (1963)
Hour of the Wolf (1968)
Cries and Whispers (1972) Nominated for Academy Award for Best Costume Design
Fanny and Alexander (1982) Won Academy Award for Best Costume Design

References

External links

1923 births
1994 deaths
Swedish costume designers
Swedish production designers
Best Costume Design Academy Award winners
Members of Nya Idun
Women production designers